Joshua Adams Lowell (March 20, 1801 – March 13, 1874) was a United States representative from Maine.  He was born in Thomaston, Massachusetts (now in Maine) on March 20, 1801.  He attended the common schools where he also taught.  He studied law, was admitted to the bar and commenced practice in  East Machias.  He was elected a member of the Maine House of Representatives. He was elected as a Democrat to the Twenty-sixth and Twenty-seventh Congresses (March 4, 1839 – March 3, 1843).  He was chairman of Committee on Expenditures in the Post Office Department (Twenty-seventh Congress).  He was not a candidate for renomination in 1842. Lowell resumed the practice of law, and died in East Machias on March 13, 1874.  His interment was in the Village Cemetery.

References

1801 births
1874 deaths
People from Thomaston, Maine
Democratic Party members of the Maine House of Representatives
People from East Machias, Maine
Maine lawyers
Democratic Party members of the United States House of Representatives from Maine
19th-century American politicians
19th-century American lawyers